U of A may refer to 

 Unit of account, a unit of measure

Universities

Oceania
 University of Adelaide, in Australia
 University of Auckland, in New Zealand

Europe
 University of Antwerp, in Belgium
 Aveiro University, in Portugal
 University of Aberdeen, in Scotland
 University of Alcalá, in Spain

North America
 University of Alberta, in Canada
 University of Akron, in the United States
 University of Alabama, in the United States
 University of Alaska System, in the United States
 University at Albany, The State University of New York, in the United States
 University of Arizona, in the United States
 University of Arkansas, in the United States
 University of Atlanta, in the United States

See also
 List of art schools as "University of the Arts" is an often used name for an arts-oriented institution of higher learning
 UA (disambiguation)